Itziar Esparza Pallarés (born 28 October 1974 in Lleida, Catalonia) is a former freestyle swimmer from Spain, who competed at two consecutive Summer Olympics for her native country, starting in 1992 in Barcelona, Spain. On both occasions she didn't reach the final in the 400m and 800m Freestyle.

References
 Spanish Olympic Committee

1974 births
Living people
Spanish female freestyle swimmers
Olympic swimmers of Spain
Swimmers at the 1992 Summer Olympics
Swimmers at the 1996 Summer Olympics
Sportspeople from Lleida
20th-century Spanish women